Suzanne Fairhurst (born 9 July 1974 in Manchester, England) is a former softball player from Australia who won a bronze medal at the 1996 Summer Olympics and 2000 Summer Olympics.

Fairhurst is a professional golfer sponsored by Club Hart.

References 

Australian people of English descent
1974 births
Living people
Australian softball players
Olympic softball players of Australia
Softball players at the 1996 Summer Olympics
Softball players at the 2000 Summer Olympics
Olympic bronze medalists for Australia
Sportspeople from Manchester
Olympic medalists in softball
Medalists at the 2000 Summer Olympics
Medalists at the 1996 Summer Olympics